Pseudochelaria is a genus of moth in the family Gelechiidae.

Species
 Pseudochelaria arbutina (Keifer, 1930)
 Pseudochelaria manzanitae (Keifer, 1930)
 Pseudochelaria pennsylvanica Dietz, 1900
 Pseudochelaria scabrella (Busck, 1913)
 Pseudochelaria walsinghami Dietz, 1900

References

 
Gelechiini